Fagus crenata, known as the Siebold's beech, Japanese beech, or buna, is a deciduous tree of the beech genus, Fagus, of the family Fagaceae.

Distribution and habitat
It is endemic to Japan, where it is widespread and often one of the dominant trees of Japan's deciduous forests. It is found from the Oshima Peninsula in Hokkaidō south to the Ōsumi Peninsula in Kyūshū. In north-east Honshū it grows in large stands from sea level up to  but in the south-west of its range it is restricted to mountainous areas and occurs in small, isolated populations. It grows in well-drained, loamy or sandy soils.

Description
It reaches  in height. The crown is rounded and the bark is smooth and grey. The simple leaves are arranged alternately along the branch. They are broadest towards the base and have 7 to 11 pairs of veins. There are flattened green whiskers at the base of the husk of the nut. The flowers are wind-pollinated. The young leaves and seeds are edible.

References

Evans, Erv (2000-2003) Fagus crenata, NC State University. Accessed 26/06/07.
Johnson, Owen & More, David (2006) Collins Tree Guide, HarperCollins, London
Plants for a Future (2004) . Accessed 13/07/14.

crenata
Endemic flora of Japan
Trees of Japan